The Westin Charlotte is a  tall high-rise in Charlotte, North Carolina, designed by John C. Portman. It was built in 2003 and has 25 floors.

See also
 List of tallest buildings in Charlotte

References

 Emporis

External links
 

Skyscraper hotels in Charlotte, North Carolina
Hotel buildings completed in 2003
John C. Portman Jr. buildings
Westin hotels